Pidarar (also written as Pitarar) is a caste of northern Kerala, India. Traditionally they perform the duty as priests in Kali temples, which involves animal.sacrifice. They belong to the Vishwamitra gotra, and follow Kaula sampradaya.

References

Social groups of Kerala